PSID stands for Persatuan Sepakbola Indonesia Djombang is a football club based in Jombang Regency, East Java. They currently compete in the Liga 3.

In the 1970s–80s, The Kebo Kicak was among the top in East Java. The golden age of PSID Jombang is also not separated from the intervention of the Regent of Jombang at that time, R. Soedirman, because he is much concerned in the field of sports and art, especially music art. 

Currently, PSID Djombang itself is struggling to navigate the tight competition Liga 3.

References

External links

Football clubs in Indonesia
Football clubs in East Java
Association football clubs established in 1953
1953 establishments in Indonesia